Hami railway station is a station servicing high-speed and conventional rail in Yizhou District, Hami, Xinjiang, China.

The station is along the line of the Lanzhou–Xinjiang high-speed railway connecting Hami to the rest of Xinjiang to the west and to Eastern Chinese cities. Conventional rail services continue to serve the station using the Lanzhou–Xinjiang railway.

Near the end of construction on August 22, 2015, a fire started around 17:00 and engulfed 600 square meters of the stations before firefighters extinguished the fire after a 30-minute battle. The station was reopened in 2014.

References

Railway stations in Xinjiang
Railway stations in China opened in 2014
Stations on the Lanzhou-Xinjiang Railway